Javgur is a commune in Cimișlia District, Moldova. It is composed of three villages: Artimonovca, Javgur and Maximeni.

References

Communes of Cimișlia District